was a Japanese journalist, essayist, and socialist leader.

Biography 
Suzuki was born in Gamagori, Aichi Prefecture, to a family descended from medieval hatamoto; however, his father had lost the family's fortune, and as a result Suzuki was forced to work his way through school. He attended Waseda University and graduated with a degree in politics and economics in 1915. After graduation, he wrote for several newspapers, including the Hochi Shimbun, Taishō Nichi Nichi Shimbun, and Mainichi Shimbun, becoming well known as a business writer.

In 1918, Suzuki was a war correspondent during the Japanese intervention in Siberia where his sympathies were with the Bolshevik movement, and was later known as a consistent opponent of Japan's war efforts. Afterwards, Suzuki returned to the Soviet Union several times, and developed a socialist worldview based on his Soviet experiences and his memories of his impoverished childhood.

As Japan became increasingly militarist, Suzuki devoted most of his energies to the socialist movement starting around 1928. With Katō Kanjū, he formed the Proletarian Workers' Conference in 1936 and the Japan Proletarian Party in 1937. However, Suzuki became an increasingly prominent target of the government, and he was arrested in 1937 under the Peace Preservation Laws. Until the end of World War II, he was prohibited from public political activity.

Following Japan's surrender in 1945, the Japan Socialist Party was formed, and Suzuki, still known as a prominent left-wing leader, joined the party. In 1946, he won a seat in the House of Representatives; he became party secretary in 1949 and chairman in 1951. As chairman of the lower house's Budget Committee in 1948, Suzuki passed a veto over Katayama Tetsu's proposed budget, which later led to the downfall of the cabinet. Later, in his inaugural speech as party chairman, he famously said "Young men, do not take up arms," which caused a huge political stir and became a rallying cry of the pacifist movement in Japan, although it was only intended to rebuke Prime Minister Yoshida Shigeru's attempt to secure aid from the United States to rebuild the military of Japan.

After the signing of the San Francisco Peace Treaty in 1952, the Socialist Party split into left and right wings. Suzuki remained chairman of the left wing, which had only 16 seats in the House of Representatives; in the 1955 elections, it jumped to 89 seats, thanks to support from the General Council of Trade Unions and popular support from a war-weary electorate that largely agreed with the party's principle of unarmed neutrality.

The two socialist parties reunited that year to form a united front against the emerging right-wing conservative Liberal Democratic Party, but crippling defeats in 1957 and 1958 reignited the left-right tension within the Socialist Party. In 1960, right-wing leaders such as Suehiro Nishio left the party and formed the Democratic Socialist Party. Taking responsibility for the party's collapse, Suzuki resigned as chairman.

During the 1960s, Suzuki gradually pressed the Socialist Party to the left, but it continued to languish as Japan's economic recovery sped up. He retired from politics in 1967 and died of liver cirrhosis in 1970.

References

20th-century journalists
1893 births
1970 deaths
People from Gamagōri
Politicians from Aichi Prefecture
Waseda University alumni
Japanese journalists
Japanese essayists
Members of the House of Representatives (Japan)
Members of the House of Representatives (Empire of Japan)
Social Democratic Party (Japan) politicians
Writers from Aichi Prefecture
20th-century essayists
Japanese war correspondents
Deaths from cirrhosis